La Laguna Airport,  is an airstrip  northwest of Marchigüe, a town in the O'Higgins Region of Chile.

The runway has an additional  of unpaved overrun on the north end.

See also

Transport in Chile
List of airports in Chile

References

External links
OpenStreetMap - La Laguna
OurAirports - La Laguna
FallingRain - La Laguna Airport

Airports in O'Higgins Region